Soumya Seth is a former Indian television actress. She gained popularity by playing the role of Navya in the serial Navya..Naye Dhadkan Naye Sawaal. She portrayed the role of Kaurwaki in Chakravartin Ashoka Samrat. She worked in shows like V The Serial and Dil Ki Nazar Se Khoobsurat. She is the niece of Bollywood actor Govinda and the cousin of Krushna Abhishek.

Life and career
Soumya began her career with an appearance in the 2007 Bollywood film, Om Shanti Om, as one of the audience in Rishi Kapoor's dance performance.

She made her television debut in the serial Navya...Naye Dhadkan Naye Sawal.  In 2011, she won the BIG Television Awards under the category of Taaza female for the show.  She played a supporting role in the show V The Serial on Channel V. In the subsequent time, she was cast in female lead roles such as Aradhya Rahul Periwal on Sony TV's Dil Ki Nazar Se Khoobsurat. She came for an episodic role in Bindaas's Yeh Hai Ashishqui as Kaurwaki in Chakravartin Ashoka Samrat.

Seth married actor Arun Kapoor on 15 January 2017 in a traditional ceremony held at the Westin Fort Lauderdale Beach Resort. The couple had a son named Ayden Kapoor in 2017. She divorced Kapoor in 2019.

Television

Awards

References

External links

 
 

Living people
Indian television actresses
Indian soap opera actresses
Actresses from Varanasi
21st-century Indian actresses
1989 births